Steve Davis (born 1957) is an English snooker player.

Steve, Stephen or Steven Davis may also refer to:

Business
 Steve Davis (American executive), American tunneling company executive
 Steven Davis (executive) (born 1958/9), CEO of Bob Evans Restaurants, former president of Long John Silver's and A&W Restaurants
 Steve Davis (business), American executive and health advocate

Entertainment
 Steve "Pablo" Davis (1916–2013), American artist and activist
 Steve Davis (bassist) (1929–1987), jazz bassist
 Stephen Davis (screenwriter) (born 1950), British screenwriter
 Steve Davis (American drummer) (born 1958), American jazz drummer
 Steve Davis (trombonist) (born 1967), American jazz trombonist
 Steve Davis (Northern Irish drummer), Northern Irish jazz drummer
 Stephen Allen Davis (1949–2022), American singer-songwriter
 Stephen Davis (music journalist), American music writer
 Steven A. Davis, New Zealand stunt man and actor
 Richard Cansino (born 1953), American voice actor credited as Steve Davis in Street Fighter II: The Animated Movie

Academics
 Steven Davis (economist), American economist at the University of Chicago
 Stephen H. Davis (1939–2021), American mathematician
 Steve Davis (scientist), earth system scientist at the University of California Irvine

Sports
 Steve Davis (running back) (born 1948), American football player
 Steve Davis (quarterback) (1952–2013), American football quarterback for the Oklahoma Sooners
 Steve Davis (umpire) (born 1952), Australian cricket umpire
 Steve Davis (infielder) (born 1953), American baseball infielder
 Steve Davis (pitcher) (born 1960), American baseball pitcher
 Steve Davis (footballer, born 1965), English footballer, academy manager at Wolverhampton Wanderers
 Steve Davis (footballer, born 1968), English footballer, coach at Bolton Wanderers
 Stephen Davis (American football) (born 1974), American football player
 Steven Davis (born 1985), Northern Irish footballer, plays for Rangers

Other
 Steve Davis (Illinois politician) (born 1949), American politician
 Stephen L. Davis, American general

See also
 Stephen Davies (disambiguation)
 List of people with surname Davis